Christine Elyse Keller (born October 6, 1952) is an American lawyer and judge from Connecticut. She is a Senior Justice of the Connecticut Supreme Court.

Education 

Keller received her Bachelor of Arts degree from Smith College and her Juris Doctor from the University of Connecticut School of Law.

Legal career

She practiced family, personal injury, and real estate law at Neighborhood Legal Services in Hartford, Connecticut, and subsequently worked at the Office of the Corporation Counsel for the City of Hartford and the law firm of Ritter and Keller.

State judicial service

Administrative judge

In 2005, she was appointed Administrative Judge for the Judicial District of Hartford, a position she held until 2007, when she was reappointed a second time as Chief Administrative Judge for Juvenile Matters, a position she held until 2012.

Connecticut Appellate Court

On January 24, 2013, Keller was nominated by Governor Dan Malloy to be a judge of the Appellate Court; the General Assembly approved her nomination on March 6, 2013. She succeed Carmen E. Espinosa, who was nominated to the Connecticut Supreme Court. She was a Superior Court Judge, having been appointed by Governor Lowell P. Weicker Jr. in 1993, and a Family Support Magistrate, having been appointed by Governor William A. O’Neill in 1989.

Connecticut Supreme Court

On July 20, 2020, Governor Ned Lamont announced the appointment of Keller to the seat on the Connecticut Supreme Court vacated by Richard N. Palmer who retired on May 27, 2020 after reaching mandatory retirement age 70. In advance of her 70th birthday, she announced on December 28, 2021, that she would take senior status, effective March 31, 2022.

Personal life

Keller is the wife of the lobbyist and former state house speaker Thomas D. Ritter, and the mother of incumbent state house speaker Matthew Ritter.

References

External links
Official Biography on State of Connecticut Judicial Branch website

|-

1952 births
Living people
20th-century American judges
20th-century American lawyers
21st-century American judges
Judges of the Connecticut Appellate Court
Politicians from Hartford, Connecticut
Smith College alumni
Superior court judges in the United States
University of Connecticut School of Law alumni
Lawyers from Hartford, Connecticut
20th-century American women lawyers
20th-century American women judges
21st-century American women judges